Rabdophaga strobilina is a gall midge and inquiline of Rabdophaga rosaria and Rabdophaga terminalis; also gall midges. It was first described by Johann Jacob Bremi-Wolf in 1847.

Description
Rabdophaga rosaria forms Camellia galls (also known as a terminal rosette gall) on willow (Salix) species. R. strobilina is a close relative of R. rosaria and the larva of strobilina live under the modified leaves of the galls made by rosaria larva. If there are many larva of strobilina, the gall can enlarge and change shape from a rosette, into a 30–40 mm long cone-shaped artichoke. R. strobilina is also an inquiline of Rabdophaga terminalis.

Distribution
The insect or gall has been found in Belgium, Denmark, Turkey and the United Kingdom.

References

External links
 Plant Parasites of Europe

strobilina
Nematoceran flies of Europe
Gall-inducing insects
Insects described in 1847
Taxa named by Johann Jacob Bremi-Wolf
Willow galls